Moses Botarel Farissol was a Jewish astronomer and mathematician of the second half of the 15th century.

He wrote a work on the calendar entitled Meleket ha-Ḳebi'ah, and compiled, under the title Nofet Ẓufim, calendric tables. Both these works, in manuscript, are preserved in the royal library at Munich.

References 

Year of death missing
Medieval Jewish astronomers
15th-century mathematicians
Year of birth unknown